The Global Energy Interconnection is a proposed global electricity network.

Idea Conception
The idea was conceived by State Grid Corporation of China (SGCC), and put forward by SGCC Chairman Liu Zhenya, at a workshop on November 12, 2015.

References

Companies of China
Proposed electric power transmission systems
Proposed electric power infrastructure
Proposed electric power infrastructure in China